Schiaffino is an Italian surname. Notable people with the surname include:

Bernardo Schiaffino (1678–1725), Italian Baroque sculptor
David Schiaffino (1913–2005), Argentine sport shooter
Eduardo Schiaffino (1858–1935), Argentine painter, critic, intellectual and historian
Francesco Maria Schiaffino (1688–1763), Italian Baroque sculptor
Juan Alberto Schiaffino (1925–2002), Italian-Uruguayan footballer
Placido Maria Schiaffino (1829–1889), Italian cardinal
Raúl Schiaffino (born 1923, date of death unknown), Uruguayan footballer
Rosanna Schiaffino (1939–2009), Italian actress
Sergio Schiaffino (born 1992), Mexican professional gridiron football defensive

Italian-language surnames